Flor is, in winemaking, a film of yeast. 

Flor or La Flor may also refer to:


People
 Flor (given name), a list of people with the given name or nickname
 Flor (surname)
 Flor (singer), Argentine pop and rock singer Florencia "Flor" Caserta (born 1984)

Arts and entertainment
 La Flor (The Flower), a 2018 Argentine film, the longest in that nation's history
 Flor (band), an American indie band
 Flor Méndez, protagonist of the novel Dona Flor and Her Two Husbands, a film and a telenovela, both with the same title
 the title character of Flor Salvaje, an American telenovela

Other uses
 Battle of La Flor, a 1928 battle between US Marines and their Nicaraguan National Guard allies against Sandinista rebels
 La Flor Airport, Costa Rica
 flor., an occasional abbreviation of floruit

See also
 Roger de Flor (1267–1305), Italian military adventurer and condottiere